Clancee Pearce (born 23 October 1990) is a former professional Australian rules footballer who played for the Fremantle Football Club in the Australian Football League (AFL).

After attending Chisholm Catholic College and then Guildford Grammar School, Pearce made his senior debut in the WAFL for Swan Districts in Round 17, 2008 and played in eight league games, including the 2008 WAFL Grand Final, which the Swans lost to Subiaco.  He had played in Swan District's colts premiership winning side in 2007.  Pearce represented Western Australia at the 2008 AFL Under 18 Championships and was named in the All-Australian Team. He was also named as the captain of the 2008 WAFL Colts Team of the Year, but was overlooked in the 2008 National Draft and instead was drafted to Fremantle in the 2009 Rookie Draft with Fremantle's fourth round selection, number 48 overall.  After displaying good form during the 2009 WAFL season, including a career high 26 disposals against Peel Thunder in late May, he was elevated to Fremantle's senior list in early June 2009.

Pearce made his AFL debut for Fremantle in Round 11 of the 2009 AFL season at Football Park against Port Adelaide, after four key players were omitted due to injury.  He was the sixth player to make his debut for Fremantle in 2009 and the fourth rookie listed player to be elevated to the senior list.  His mother is Indian and he is only the fourth player of Indian descent to play AFL football.

He kicked a goal in his debut match, minutes after fellow debutant and Swan Districts teammate Michael Walters also kicked a goal.  In total he gathered 16 possessions and six marks, but Fremantle lost the match by 24 points.

He was delisted by Fremantle at the conclusion of the 2016 season and re-signed to play with Swan Districts in the WAFL. However, in January 2017 Pearce ruptured his anterior cruciate ligament during training and was unable to play for the whole of the 2017 season.

Statistics

|-
|- style="background-color: #EAEAEA"
! scope="row" style="text-align:center" | 2009
|
| 46 || 8 || 6 || 4 || 64 || 37 || 101 || 32 || 14 || 0.8 || 0.5 || 8.0 || 4.6 || 12.6 || 4.0 || 1.8
|-
! scope="row" style="text-align:center" | 2010
|
| 46 || 6 || 2 || 0 || 36 || 39 || 75 || 24 || 20 || 0.3 || 0.0 || 6.0 || 6.5 || 12.5 || 4.0 || 3.3
|- style="background-color: #EAEAEA"
! scope="row" style="text-align:center" | 2011
|
| 46 || 12 || 5 || 8 || 78 || 73 || 151 || 37 || 58 || 0.4 || 0.7 || 6.5 || 6.1 || 12.6 || 3.1 || 4.8
|-
! scope="row" style="text-align:center" | 2012
|
| 46 || 24 || 16 || 6 || 247 || 222 || 469 || 120 || 103 || 0.7 || 0.2 || 10.3 || 9.2 || 19.5 || 5.0 || 4.3
|- style="background-color: #EAEAEA"
! scope="row" style="text-align:center" | 2013
|
| 46 || 19 || 2 || 3 || 195 || 144 || 339 || 110 || 44 || 0.1 || 0.2 || 10.3 || 7.6 || 17.8 || 5.8 || 2.3
|-
! scope="row" style="text-align:center" | 2014
|
| 46 || 9 || 0 || 2 || 56 || 66 || 122 || 33 || 16 || 0.0 || 0.2 || 6.2 || 7.3 || 13.6 || 3.7 || 1.8
|- style="background-color: #EAEAEA"
! scope="row" style="text-align:center" | 2015
|
| 46 || 18 || 5 || 1 || 192 || 144 || 336 || 99 || 41 || 0.3 || 0.1 || 10.7 || 8.0 || 18.7 || 5.5 || 2.3
|-
! scope="row" style="text-align:center" | 2016
|
| 46 || 4 || 0 || 0 || 41 || 39 || 80 || 19 || 9 || 0.0 || 0.0 || 10.2 || 9.8 || 20.0 || 4.8 || 2.2
|- class="sortbottom"
! colspan=3| Career
! 100
! 36
! 24
! 909
! 764
! 1673
! 474
! 305
! 0.4
! 0.2
! 9.1
! 7.6
! 16.7
! 4.7
! 3.0
|}

References

External links

WAFL Player Profile and Statistics

1990 births
Living people
Fremantle Football Club players
Swan Districts Football Club players
Peel Thunder Football Club players
People educated at Guildford Grammar School
Australian sportspeople of Indian descent
Australian people of Anglo-Indian descent
Australian rules footballers from Western Australia